Willis Todman (born 14 January 1966 in Road Town, Tortola) is a sprinter who represented the British Virgin Islands.

Todman represented British Virgin Islands at the Summer Olympics when he competed in the 1988 Summer Olympics in Seoul, he entered the 400 metres where he finished 7th in his heat so didn't qualify for the next round, eight years later he competed in Atlanta at the 1996 Summer Olympics, where in the 4x100 metres relay the team finished 7th in the heat so didn't qualify for the next round.

His younger brother Mario also competed at the 1996 Summer Olympics in the relays.

References

1966 births
Living people
British Virgin Islands male sprinters
Athletes (track and field) at the 1988 Summer Olympics
Athletes (track and field) at the 1991 Pan American Games
Athletes (track and field) at the 1996 Summer Olympics
Olympic athletes of the British Virgin Islands
Pan American Games competitors for the British Virgin Islands